There have been different opinions among historians with regard to the extent of antisemitism in America's past and how American antisemitism contrasted with its European counterpart. Earlier students of American Jewish life minimized the presence of antisemitism in the United States, which they considered a late and alien phenomenon that arose on the American scene in the late 19th century.  More recently however, scholars have asserted that no period in American Jewish history was free from antisemitism. The debate about the significance of antisemitism during different periods of American history has continued to the present day.

The first governmental incident of anti-Jewish sentiment was recorded during the American Civil War, when General Ulysses S. Grant issued a General Order (quickly rescinded by President Abraham Lincoln) of expulsion against Jews from the portions of Tennessee, Kentucky and Mississippi that were under his control.

During the first half of the 20th century, Jews were discriminated against and barred from working in some fields of employment, barred from renting and/or owning certain properties, not accepted as members by social clubs, barred from resort areas and barred from enrolling in colleges by quotas. Antisemitism reached its peak during the interwar period with the rise of the Ku Klux Klan in the 1920s, antisemitic publications in The Dearborn Independent, and incendiary radio speeches by Father Coughlin in the late 1930s.

Following World War II and the Holocaust, anti-Jewish sentiment significantly declined in the United States. However, there has been an upsurge in the number of antisemitic hate crimes in recent years.

Colonial era
In the mid 17th century, Peter Stuyvesant, the last Director-General of the Dutch colony of New Netherland, sought to maintain the position of the Dutch Reformed Church in America refusing to allow other denominations such as Lutherans, Catholics and Quakers the right to organize a church. He also described Jews as "deceitful", "very repugnant", and "hateful enemies and blasphemers of the name of Christ". Prior to this, the inhabitants of the Dutch settlement of Vlishing had declared that "the law of love, peace, and liberty" extended to "Jews, Turks, and Egyptians."

19th century
According to Peter Knight, throughout most of the 18th and 19th centuries, the United States rarely experienced antisemitic action comparable to the sort that was endemic in Europe during the same period. Jews were viewed as a race beginning in the 1870s, but this understanding was considered positive, as Jews were viewed as white.

Civil War

Major General Ulysses S. Grant was influenced by these sentiments and issued General Order No. 11 expelling Jews from areas under his control in western Tennessee:

The Jews, as a class violating every regulation of trade established by the Treasury Department and also department orders, are hereby expelled ... within twenty-four hours from the receipt of this order.

Grant later issued an order "that no Jews are to be permitted to travel on the road southward."  His aide, Colonel John V. DuBois, ordered "all cotton speculators, Jews, and all vagabonds with no honest means of support", to leave the district. "The Israelites especially should be kept out ... they are such an intolerable nuisance."

This order was quickly rescinded by President Abraham Lincoln but not until it had been enforced in a number of towns.  According to Jerome Chanes, Lincoln's revocation of Grant's order was based primarily on "constitutional strictures against ... the federal government singling out any group for special treatment."  Chanes characterizes General Order No. 11 as "unique in the history of the United States" because it was the only overtly antisemitic official action of the United States government.

Immigration from Eastern Europe

Between 1881 and 1920, approximately 3 million Ashkenazi Jews from Eastern Europe immigrated to America, many of them fleeing pogroms and the difficult economic conditions which were widespread in much of Eastern Europe during this time. Pogroms in the Russian Empire prompted waves of Jewish immigrants after 1881. Jews, along with many Eastern and Southern European immigrants, came to work the country's growing mines and factories. Many Americans distrusted these Jewish immigrants.

Between 1900 and 1924, approximately 1.75 million Jews immigrated to America's shores, the bulk from Eastern Europe. Whereas before 1900, American Jews never amounted even to 1 percent of America's total population, by 1930 Jews formed about 3.5 percent. This dramatic increase, combined with the upward mobility of some Jews, contributed to a resurgence of antisemitism.

As the European immigration swelled the Jewish population of the United States, there developed a growing sense of Jews as different. Indeed, the United States government's Census Bureau classified Jews as their own race, Hebrews, and a 1909 effort led by Simon Wolf to remove Hebrew as a race through a Congressional bill failed. Jerome Chanes attributes this perception on the fact that Jews were concentrated in a small number of occupations: they were perceived as being mostly clothing manufacturers, shopkeepers and department store owners. He notes that so-called "German Jews" (who in reality came not just from Germany but from Austria-Hungary and other countries as well) found themselves increasingly segregated by a widespread social antisemitism that became even more prevalent in the twentieth century and which persists in vestigial form even today.

Populism

In the middle of the 19th century, a number of German Jewish immigrants founded investment banking firms which later became mainstays of the industry.  Most prominent Jewish banks in the United States were investment banks, rather than commercial banks. Although Jews played only a minor role in the nation's commercial banking system, the prominence of Jewish investment bankers such as the Rothschild family in Europe, and Jacob Schiff, of Kuhn, Loeb & Co. in New York City, made the claims of antisemites believable to some.

One example of allegations of Jewish control of world finances, during the 1890s, is Mary Elizabeth Lease, an American farming activist and populist from Kansas, who frequently blamed the Rothschilds and the "British bankers" as the source of farmers' ills.

The Morgan Bonds scandal injected populist antisemitism into the 1896 presidential campaign. It was disclosed that President Grover Cleveland had sold bonds to a syndicate which included J. P. Morgan and the Rothschilds house, bonds which that syndicate was now selling for a profit, the Populists used it as an opportunity to uphold their view of history, and argue that Washington and Wall Street were in the hands of the international Jewish banking houses.

Another focus of antisemitic feeling was the allegation that Jews were at the center of an international conspiracy to fix the currency and thus the economy to a single gold standard.

According to Deborah Dash Moore, populist antisemitism used the Jew to symbolize both capitalism and urbanism so as to personify concepts that were too abstract to serve as satisfactory objects of animosity.

Richard Hofstadter describes populist antisemitism as "entirely verbal."  He continues by asserting that, "(it) was a mode of expression, a rhetorical style, not a tactic or a program."  He notes that, "(it) did not lead to exclusion laws, much less to riots or pogroms."  Hofstadter still concludes, however, that the "Greenback-Populist tradition activated most of ... modern popular antisemitism in the United States."

Early 20th century

In the first half of the 20th century, Jews were discriminated against in employment, access to residential and resort areas, membership in clubs and organizations, and in tightened quotas on Jewish enrollment and teaching positions in colleges and universities. Restaurants, hotels and other establishments that barred Jews from entry were called "restricted".

Lynching of Leo Frank
In 1913, a Jewish-American in Atlanta named Leo Frank was convicted for the rape and murder of Mary Phagan, a 13-year-old Christian girl who he employed. In the middle of the night on April 27, 1913, a 13-year-old girl named Mary Phagan was found dead by a night watchman in the basement of a pencil factory in Atlanta, Georgia. Leo Frank, the superintendent of the factory, was the last person to acknowledge seeing her alive earlier that day after paying her weekly wages. Detectives took Frank to the scene of the crime and the morgue to view the body. After further questioning, they concluded that he was most likely not the murderer. In the days following, rumors began to spread amongst the public that the girl had been sexually assaulted prior to her death. This sparked outrage amongst the public which called for immediate action and justice for her murder. On April 29, following Phagan's funeral, public outrage reached its pinnacle. Under immense pressure to identify a suspect, detectives arrested Leo Frank on the same day. Being a Jewish factory owner, previously from the north, Frank was an easy target for the antisemitic population who already distrusted northern merchants who had come to the south to work following the American Civil War. During the trial, the primary witness was Jim Conley, a black janitor who worked at the factory. Initially a suspect, Conley became the state's main witness in the trial against Frank.

Prior to the trial, Conely had given four conflicting statements regarding his role in the murder. In court, the Frank's lawyers were unable to disprove Conley's claims that he was forced by Frank to dispose of Phagan's body. The trial gathered immense attention especially from Atlantans, who gathered in large crowds around the courthouse demanding for a guilty verdict. In addition to this, much of the media coverage at the time took an antisemitic tone and after 25 days, Leo Frank was found guilty of murder on August 25 and sentenced to death by hanging on August 26. The verdict was met with cheers and celebration form the crowd. Following the verdict, Frank's lawyers submitted a total of five appeals to the Georgia Supreme Court as well as the U.S. Supreme Court claiming that Frank's absence on the day of the verdict and the amount of public pressure and influence swayed the jury. After this, the case was brought to Georgia governor John M. Slaton. Despite the public demanding for him to hold the verdict, Slaton changed Frank's verdict from death sentence to life imprisonment, believing that his innocence would eventually be established and he would be set free. This decision was met with immense public outrage, causing riots and even forcing Slaton to declare Martial Law at one point. On August 16, 1915, 25 citizens stormed a prison farm in Milledgeville where Leo Frank was being held. Taking Frank from his cell, they drove him to Marietta, the hometown of Mary Phagan, and hanged him from a tree. Leaders of the lynch mob would later gather at Stone Mountain to revive the Ku Klux Klan.

In response to the lynching of Leo Frank, Sigmund Livingston founded the Anti-Defamation League (ADL) under the sponsorship of B'nai B'rith.  The ADL became the leading Jewish group fighting antisemitism in the United States.  The lynching of Leo Frank coincided with and helped spark the revival of the Ku Klux Klan. The Klan disseminated the view that anarchists, communists and Jews were subverting American values and ideals.

World War I
With the American entry into World War I, Jews were targeted by antisemites as "slackers" and "war-profiteers" responsible for many of the ills of the country.  For example, a U.S. Army manual published for war recruits stated that, "The foreign born, and especially Jews, are more apt to malinger than the native-born." When ADL representatives protested about this to President Woodrow Wilson, he ordered the manual recalled. The ADL also mounted a campaign to give Americans the facts about military and civilian contributions of Jews to the war effort.

1920s
Antisemitism in the United States reached its peak during the interwar period.  The rise of the Ku Klux Klan in the 1920s, the antisemitic works of newspapers and radio speeches in the late 1930s indicated the strength of attacks on the Jewish community.

One element in American antisemitism during the 1920s was the identification of Jews with Bolshevism where the concept of Bolshevism was used pejoratively in the country. (see article on "Jewish Bolshevism").

Immigration legislation enacted in the United States in 1921 and 1924 was interpreted widely as being at least partly anti-Jewish in intent because it strictly limited the immigration quotas of eastern European nations with large Jewish populations, nations from which approximately 3 million Jews had immigrated to the United States by 1920.

Discrimination in education and professions

Jews encountered resistance when they tried to move into white-collar and professional positions. Banking, insurance, public utilities, medical schools, hospitals, large law firms and faculty positions, restricted the entrance of Jews. This era of "polite" Judeophobia through social discrimination, underwent an ideological escalation in the 1930s.

Restriction on immigration
In 1924, Congress passed the Johnson–Reed Act severely restricting immigration. Although the act did not specifically target Jews, the effect of the legislation was that 86% of the 165,000 permitted entries were from Northern European countries, with Germany, Britain, and Ireland having the highest quotas. The act effectively diminished the flow of Jewish immigrants from Eastern Europe to a trickle.

The Dearborn Independent

Henry Ford was a pacifist who opposed World War I, and he believed that Jews were responsible for starting wars in order to profit from them: "International financiers are behind all war. They are what is called the international Jew: German Jews, French Jews, English Jews, American Jews. I believe that in all those countries except our own the Jewish financier is supreme ... here the Jew is a threat". Ford believed that Jews were responsible for capitalism, and in their role as financiers, they did not contribute anything of value to society.

In 1915, during World War I, Ford blamed Jews for instigating the war, saying "I know who caused the war: German-Jewish bankers." Later, in 1925, Ford said "What I oppose most is the international Jewish money power that is met in every war. That is what I oppose—a power that has no country and that can order the young men of all countries out to death'". According to author Steven Watts, Ford's antisemitism was partially due to a noble desire for world peace.

Ford became aware of The Protocols of the Elders of Zion and believed it to be a legitimate document, and he published portions of it in his newspaper, the Dearborn Independent. Also, in 1920–21 the Dearborn Independent carried a series of articles expanding on the themes of financial control by Jews, entitled:

 Jewish Idea in American Monetary Affairs:  The remarkable story of Paul Warburg, who began work on the United States monetary system after three weeks residence in this country
 Jewish Idea Molded Federal Reserve System: What Baruch was in War Material, Paul Warburg was in War Finances; Some Curious revelations of money and politics.
 Jewish Idea of a Central Bank for America: The evolution of Paul M. Warburg's idea of Federal Reserve System without government management.
 How Jewish International Finance Functions: The Warburg family and firm divided the world between them and did amazing things which non-Jews could not do
 Jewish Power and America's Money Famine: The Warburg Federal Reserve sucks money to New York, leaving productive sections of the country in disastrous need.
 The Economic Plan of International Jews: An outline of the Protocolists' monetary policy, with notes on the parallel found in Jewish financial practice.

One of the articles, "Jewish Power and America's Money Famine", asserted that the power exercised by Jews over the nation's supply of money was insidious by helping deprive farmers and others outside the banking coterie of money when they needed it most. The article asked the question: "Where is the American gold supply? ... It may be in the United States but it does not belong to the United States" and it drew the conclusion that Jews controlled the gold supply and, hence, American money.

Another of the articles, "Jewish Idea Molded Federal Reserve System" was a reflection of Ford's suspicion of the Federal Reserve System and its proponent, Paul Warburg. Ford believed the Federal Reserve system was secretive and insidious.

These articles gave rise to claims of antisemitism against Ford, and in 1929 he signed a statement apologizing for the articles.

1930s
Antisemitic activists in the 1930s were led by Father Charles Coughlin, William Dudley Pelley and Gerald L. K. Smith. Ford's attacks on Jews continued to be circulated, although the KKK was practically defunct. They promulgated various interrelated conspiracy theories, widely spreading the fear that Jews were working for the destruction or replacement of white Americans and Christianity in the U.S. 

According to Gilman and Katz, antisemitism increased dramatically in the 1930s with demands being made to exclude American Jews from American social, political and economic life.

During the 1930s and 1940s, right-wing demagogues linked the Great Depression of the 1930s, the New Deal, President Franklin Roosevelt, and the threat of war in Europe to the machinations of an imagined international Jewish conspiracy that was both communist and capitalist. A new ideology appeared which accused "the Jews" of dominating Franklin Roosevelt's administration, of causing the Great Depression, and of dragging the United States into World War II against a new Germany which deserved nothing but admiration. Roosevelt's "New Deal" was derisively referred to as the "Jew Deal".

Father Charles Coughlin, a radio preacher, as well as many other prominent public figures, condemned "the Jews," Gerald L. K. Smith, a Disciples of Christ minister, was the founder (1937) of the Committee of One Million and publisher (beginning in 1942) of The Cross and the Flag, a magazine that declared that "Christian character is the basis of all real Americanism."  Other antisemitic agitators included Fritz Julius Kuhn of the German-American Bund, William Dudley Pelley, and the Rev. Gerald Winrod.

In the end, promoters of antisemitism achieved no more than a passing popularity as the threat of Nazi Germany became more and more evident to the American electorate.  Steven Roth asserts that there was never a real possibility of a "Jewish question" appearing on the American political agenda as it did in Europe; according to Roth, the resistance to political antisemitism in the United States was due to the heterogeneity of the American political structure.

American attitudes towards Jews

In a 1938 poll, approximately 60 percent of the respondents held a low opinion of Jews, labeling them "greedy," "dishonest," and "pushy." 41 percent of respondents agreed that Jews had "too much power in the United States," and this figure rose to 58 percent by 1945. Several surveys taken from 1940 to 1946 found that Jews were seen as a greater threat to the welfare of the United States than any other national, religious, or racial group.

Charles Coughlin

The main spokesman for antisemitic sentiment was Charles Coughlin, a Catholic priest whose weekly radio program drew between 5 and 12 million listeners in the late 1930s. Coughlin's newspaper, Social Justice, reached a circulation of 800,000 at its peak in 1937.

After the 1936 election, Coughlin increasingly expressed sympathy for the fascist policies of Hitler and Mussolini, as an antidote to Bolshevism. His weekly radio broadcasts became suffused with themes regarded as overtly antisemitic. He blamed the Depression on an international conspiracy of Jewish bankers, and also claimed that Jewish bankers were behind the Russian Revolution.

Coughlin began publication of a newspaper, Social Justice, during this period, in which he printed antisemitic polemics such as The Protocols of the Elders of Zion. Like Joseph Goebbels, Coughlin claimed that Marxist atheism in Europe was a Jewish plot. The 5 December 1938 issue of Social Justice included an article by Coughlin which closely resembled a speech made by Goebbels on 13 September 1935 attacking Jews, atheists and communists, with some sections being copied verbatim by Coughlin from an English translation of the Goebbels speech.

On November 20, 1938, two weeks after Kristallnacht, when Jews across Germany were attacked and killed, and Jewish businesses, homes and synagogues burned, Coughlin blamed the Jewish victims, saying that "Jewish persecution only followed after Christians first were persecuted." After this speech, and as his programs became more antisemitic, some radio stations, including those in New York and Chicago, began refusing to air his speeches without pre-approved scripts; in New York, his programs were cancelled by WINS and WMCA, leaving Coughlin to broadcasting on the Newark part-time station WHBI.  This made Coughlin a hero in Nazi Germany, where papers ran headlines like: "America is Not Allowed to Hear the Truth."

On December 18, 1938, two thousand of Coughlin's followers marched in New York protesting potential asylum law changes that would allow more Jews (including refugees from Hitler's persecution) into the US, chanting, "Send Jews back where they came from in leaky boats!" and "Wait until Hitler comes over here!" The protests continued for several months. Donald Warren, using information from the FBI and German government archives, has also argued that Coughlin received indirect funding from Nazi Germany during this period.

After 1936, Coughlin began supporting an organization called the Christian Front, which claimed him as an inspiration. In January, 1940, the Christian Front was shut down when the FBI discovered the group was arming itself and "planning to murder Jews, communists, and 'a dozen Congressmen'" and eventually establish, in J. Edgar Hoover's words, "a dictatorship, similar to the Hitler dictatorship in Germany." Coughlin publicly stated, after the plot was discovered, that he still did not "disassociate himself from the movement," and though he was never linked directly to the plot, his reputation suffered a fatal decline.

After the attack on Pearl Harbor and the declaration of war in December 1941, the anti-interventionist movement (such as the America First Committee) sputtered out, and isolationists like Coughlin were seen as being sympathetic to the enemy. In 1942, the new bishop of Detroit ordered Coughlin to stop his controversial political activities and confine himself to his duties as a parish priest.

Pelley and Winrod
William Dudley Pelley founded (1933) the antisemitic Silvershirt Legion of America; nine years later he was convicted of sedition. And Gerald Winrod, leader of Defenders of the Christian Faith, was eventually indicted for conspiracy to cause insubordination in the United States Armed Forces during World War II.

America First Committee

The avant-garde of the new non-interventionism was the America First Committee, which included the aviation hero Charles Lindbergh and many prominent Americans. The America First Committee opposed any involvement in the war in Europe.

Officially, America First avoided any appearance of antisemitism and voted to drop Henry Ford as a member for his overt antisemitism.

In a speech delivered on September 11, 1941, at an America First rally, Lindbergh claimed that three groups had been "pressing this country toward war": the Roosevelt Administration, the British, and the Jews—and complained about what he insisted was the Jews' "large ownership and influence in our motion pictures, our press, our radio and our government."

In an expurgated portion of his published diaries Lindbergh wrote: "We must limit to a reasonable amount the Jewish influence. ... Whenever the Jewish percentage of total population becomes too high, a reaction seems to invariably occur. It is too bad because a few Jews of the right type are, I believe, an asset to any country."

German American Bund

The German American Bund held parades in New York City in the late 1930s which featured Nazi uniforms and flags featuring swastikas alongside American flags. Some 20,000 people heard Bund leader Fritz Julius Kuhn criticize President Franklin D. Roosevelt by repeatedly referring to him as "Frank D. Rosenfeld", calling his New Deal the "Jew Deal", and espousing his belief in the existence of a Bolshevik-Jewish conspiracy in America.

Refugees from Nazi Germany
In the years before and during World War II the United States Congress, the Roosevelt Administration, and public opinion expressed concern about the fate of Jews in Europe but consistently refused to permit immigration of Jewish refugees.

In a report issued by the State Department, Undersecretary of State Stuart Eizenstat noted that the United States accepted only 21,000 refugees from Europe and did not significantly raise or even fill its restrictive quotas, accepting far fewer Jews per capita than many of the neutral European countries and fewer in absolute terms than Switzerland.

According to David Wyman, "The United States and its Allies were willing to attempt almost nothing to save the Jews." There is some debate as to whether U.S. policies were generally targeted against all immigrants or specifically against Jews in particular. Wyman characterized FDR advisor and State Department official in charge of immigration policy Breckinridge Long as a nativist, more anti-immigrant than just antisemitic.

SS St. Louis 

The SS St. Louis sailed out of Hamburg into the Atlantic Ocean in May 1939 carrying one non-Jewish and 936 (mainly German) Jewish refugees seeking asylum from Nazi persecution just before World War II. On 4 June 1939, having failed to obtain permission to disembark passengers in Cuba, the St. Louis was also refused permission to unload on orders of President Roosevelt as the ship waited in the Caribbean Sea between Florida and Cuba.

The Holocaust
During the Holocaust, antisemitism was a factor that limited American Jewish action during the war, and put American Jews in a difficult position. It is clear that antisemitism was a prevalent attitude in the US, which was especially convenient for America during the Holocaust. In America, antisemitism, which reached high levels in the late 1930s, continued to rise in the 1940s. During the years before Pearl Harbor, over a hundred antisemitic organizations were responsible for pumping hate propaganda to the American public. Furthermore, especially in New York City and Boston, young gangs vandalized Jewish cemeteries and synagogues, and attacks on Jewish youngsters were common. Swastikas and anti-Jewish slogans, as well as antisemitic literature, were spread. In 1944, a public opinion poll showed that a quarter of Americans still regarded Jews as a "menace." Antisemitism in the State Department played a large role in Washington's hesitant response to the plight of European Jews persecuted by Nazis.

In a 1943 speech on the floor of Congress quoted in both The Jewish News of Detroit and the antisemitic magazine The Defender of Wichita Mississippi Representative John E. Rankin espoused a conspiracy of "alien-minded" Communist Jews arranging for white women to be raped by African American men:

US Government policy
Josiah DuBois wrote the famous "Report to the Secretary on the Acquiescence of This Government in the Murder of the Jews," which Treasury Secretary Henry Morgenthau, Jr., used to convince President Franklin D. Roosevelt to establish the War Refugee Board in 1944. Randolph Paul was also a principal sponsor of this report, the first contemporaneous Government paper attacking America's dormant complicity in the Holocaust.

Entitled "Report to the Secretary on the Acquiescence of This Government in the Murder of the Jews", the document was an indictment of the U.S. State Department's diplomatic, military, and immigration policies. Among other things, the Report narrated the State Department's inaction and in some instances active opposition to the release of funds for the Jews in Nazi-occupied Europe, and condemned immigration policies that closed American doors to Jewish refugees from countries then engaged in their systematic slaughter.

The catalyst for the Report was an incident involving 70,000 Romanian Jews whose evacuation from the Kingdom of Romania could have been procured with a $170,000 bribe. The Foreign Funds Control unit of the Treasury, which was within Paul's jurisdiction, authorized the payment of the funds, the release of which both the President and Secretary of State Cordell Hull supported. From mid-July 1943, when the proposal was made and Treasury approved, through December 1943, a combination of the State Department's bureaucracy and the British Ministry of Economic Warfare interposed various obstacles. The Report was the product of frustration over that event.

On January 16, 1944, Morgenthau and Paul personally delivered the paper to President Roosevelt, warning him that Congress would act if he did not. The result was Executive Order 9417, creating the War Refugee Board composed of the Secretaries of State, Treasury and War. Issued on January 22, 1944, the Executive Order declared that "it is the policy of this Government to take all measures within its power to rescue the victims of enemy oppression who are in imminent danger of death and otherwise to afford such victims all possible relief and assistance consistent with the successful prosecution of the war."
 
It has been estimated that 190,000–200,000 Jews could have been saved during the Second World War had it not been for bureaucratic obstacles to immigration deliberately created by Breckinridge Long and others.

1950s

Liberty Lobby

Liberty Lobby was a political advocacy organization which was founded in 1955 by Willis Carto in 1955.  Liberty Lobby was founded as a conservative political organization and was known to hold strongly antisemitic views and to be a devotee of the writings of Francis Parker Yockey, who was one of a handful of post-World War II writers who revered Adolf Hitler.

Late twentieth century
The Nixon White House tapes released during the Watergate scandal reveal that President Richard Nixon made numerous anti-Semitic remarks during his presidency. For example he repeatedly referred to National Security Advisor Henry Kissinger as "Jew boy," and blamed the anti-Vietnam War movement and leaking of the Pentagon Papers on Jews.

Antisemitic violence in this era includes the 1977 shootings at Brith Sholom Kneseth Israel synagogue in St. Louis, Missouri, the 1984 murder of Alan Berg, the 1985 Goldmark Murders, and the 1986 Murder of Neal Rosenblum.

NSPA march in Skokie
Seeking a venue,  In 1977 and 1978, members of the National Socialist Party of America (NSPA) chose Skokie. Because of the large number of Holocaust survivors in Skokie, it was believed that the march would be disruptive, and the village refused to allow it. They passed three new ordinances requiring damage deposits, banning marches in military uniforms and limiting the distribution of hate speech literature. The American Civil Liberties Union interceded on behalf of the NSPA in National Socialist Party of America v. Village of Skokie seeking a parade permit and to invalidate the three new Skokie ordinances.

However, due to a subsequent lifting of the Marquette Park ban, the NSPA ultimately held their rally in Chicago on July 7, 1978, instead of in Skokie.

African-American community

In 1984, civil rights leader Jessie Jackson speaking to Washington Post reporter Milton Coleman referred to Jews as "Hymies" and New York City as "Hymietown." He later apologized.

During the Crown Heights riot, marchers proceeded carrying antisemitic signs and an Israeli flag was burned. Ultimately, black and Jewish leaders developed an outreach program between their communities to help calm and possibly improve racial relations in Crown Heights over the next decade.

According to Anti-Defamation League surveys begun in 1964, African Americans are significantly more likely than white Americans to hold antisemitic beliefs, although there is a strong correlation between education level and the rejection of antisemitic stereotypes for all races. However, black Americans of all education levels are nevertheless significantly more likely than whites of the same education level to be antisemitic. In the 1998 survey, blacks (34%) were nearly four times as likely as whites (9%) to fall into the most antisemitic category (those agreeing with at least 6 of 11 statements that were potentially or clearly antisemitic). Among blacks with no college education, 43% fell into the most antisemitic group (vs. 18% for the general population), which fell to 27% among blacks with some college education, and 18% among blacks with a four-year college degree (vs. 5% for the general population).

Other manifestations

During the early 1980s, isolationists on the far right made overtures to anti-war activists on the left in the United States in an attempt to join forces and protest against government policies in areas where they shared concerns. This was mainly in the area of civil liberties, opposition to United States military intervention overseas and opposition to US support for Israel. As they interacted, some of the classic right-wing antisemitic scapegoating conspiracy theories began to seep into progressive circles, including stories about how a "New World Order", also called the "Shadow Government" or "The Octopus", was manipulating world governments. Antisemitic conspiracism was "peddled aggressively" by right-wing groups. Some on the left adopted the rhetoric, which was made possible by their lack of knowledge about the history of fascism and its use of "scapegoating, reductionist and simplistic solutions, demagoguery, and a conspiracy theory of history."

Towards the end of 1990, as the movement against the Gulf War began to build, a number of far-right and antisemitic groups sought out alliances with left-wing anti-war coalitions, who began to speak openly about a "Jewish lobby" that was encouraging the United States to invade Ba'athist Iraq. This idea evolved into conspiracy theories about a "Zionist-occupied government" (ZOG), which has been seen as equivalent to the early-20th century antisemitic hoax,The Protocols of the Elders of Zion. The anti-war movement as a whole rejected these overtures by the political right.

In the context of the first US-Iraq war, on September 15, 1990, Pat Buchanan appeared on The McLaughlin Group and said that "there are only two groups that are beating the drums for war in the Middle East – the Israeli defense ministry and its 'amen corner' in the United States." He also said: "The Israelis want this war desperately because they want the United States to destroy the Iraqi war machine. They want us to finish them off. They don't care about our relations with the Arab world."

21st century

Many in the Jewish community celebrated the vice-presidential candidacy of Senator Joseph Lieberman in the 2000 presidential election as marking a milestone in the decline of antisemitism in the United States.

New antisemitism

In recent years some scholars have advanced the concept of New antisemitism, coming simultaneously from the left, the far right, and radical Islam, which tends to focus on opposition to the creation of a Jewish homeland in the State of Israel, and argue that the language of Anti-Zionism and criticism of Israel are used to attack the Jews more broadly. In this view, the proponents of the new concept believe that criticisms of Israel and anti-Zionism are often disproportionate in degree and unique in kind, and attribute this to antisemitism.

A 2009 study entitled "Modern Anti-Semitism and Anti-Israeli Attitudes", published in the Journal of Personality and Social Psychology in 2009, tested new theoretical model of antisemitism among Americans in the Greater New York area with 3 experiments. The research team's theoretical model proposed that mortality salience (reminding people that they will someday die) increases antisemitism and that antisemitism is often expressed as anti-Israel attitudes. The first experiment showed that mortality salience led to higher levels of antisemitism and lower levels of support for Israel. The study's methodology was designed to tease out antisemitic attitudes that are concealed by polite people . The second experiment showed that mortality salience caused people to perceive Israel as very important, but did not cause them to perceive any other country this way. The third experiment showed that mortality salience led to a desire to punish Israel for human rights violations but not to a desire to punish Russia or India for identical human rights violations. According to the researchers, their results "suggest that Jews constitute a unique cultural threat to many people's worldviews, that anti-Semitism causes hostility to Israel, and that hostility to Israel may feed back to increase anti-Semitism." Furthermore, "those claiming that there is no connection between antisemitism and hostility toward Israel are wrong."

In October 2014 the controversial opera The Death of Klinghoffer was staged in the Metropolitan Opera in New-York. The opera tells the story of the 1985 hijacking of the Achille Lauro cruise ship by Palestinian terrorists, and the killing of Jewish passenger Leon Klinghoffer. Some of the criticism opposed to the opera claimed it's partly antisemitic and glorifies the killers, as American writer and feminist Phyllis Chesler, an opera aficionado, wrote:

The Death of Klinghoffer also demonizes Israel—which is what anti-Semitism is partly about today. It incorporates lethal Islamic (and now universal) pseudo-histories about Israel and Jews. It beatifies terrorism, both musically and in the libretto.

College campuses
On April 3, 2006, the U.S. Commission on Civil Rights announced its finding that incidents of antisemitism are a "serious problem" on college campuses throughout the United States.

Stephen H. Norwood compares the Antisemitism in contemporary American University to the antisemitism in campuses during the Nazi era. His article shows how the support in Anti-Zionist opinions encourages antisemitism inside American campus. Norwood describes in his article: "In 2002, Muslim student groups at San Francisco State University similarly invoked the medieval blood libel, distributing fliers showing a can with a picture of a dead baby beneath a large drop of blood and two Israeli flags, captioned: "Made in Israel. Palestinian Children Meat. Slaughtered According to Jewish Rites Under American License." On that campus a mob menaced Jewish students with taunts of "Hitler did not finish the job" and "Go back to Russia." The transfer between the criticism on Israel to pure antisemitism is significant.

During April 2014 there were at least 3 incidents of swastika drawings on Jewish property in University dormitories. At UCF for example, a Jewish student found 9 swastikas carved into walls of her apartment.

On the beginning of September 2014 there were two cases of antisemitism in College campuses: two students from East Carolina University sprayed swastika on the apartment door of a Jewish student, while on the same day, a Jewish student from the University of North Carolina at Charlotte was told "to go burn in an oven." The student had also told the media she is "hunted" because of her support in Israel: "I have been called a terrorist, baby killer, woman killer, [told that] I use blood to make matzah and other foods, Christ killer, occupier, and much more."

In October 2014 fliers were handed out in the University of California in Santa Barbara that claimed "9/11 Was an Outside Job" with a large blue Star of David. The fliers contained links to several websites that accused Israel of the attack. A few days later antisemitic graffiti was found on a Jewish fraternity house in Emory University in Atlanta. Another graffiti incident occurred in Northeastern University, where swastikas drawn on flyers for a school event.

A survey published in February 2015 by Trinity College and the Louis D. Brandeis Center for Human Rights Under Law found out that 54 percent of the participants had been subject to or witnessing antisemitism on their campus. The survey included 1,157 self-identified Jewish students at 55 campuses nationwide. The most significant origin for antisemitism, according to the survey was "from an individual student" (29 percent). Other origins were: in clubs/ societies, in lecture/ class, in student union, etc. The findings of the research compared to a parallel study conducted in United kingdom, and the results were similar.

In October 2015 it was reported that a few cars in the parking lot of the UC Davis were vandalized and scratched with antisemitic slurs and swastika sketches. A few days later, antisemitic slurs were found on a chalkboard in a center of the campus at Towson University.

Nation of Islam

Some Jewish organizations, Christian organizations, Muslim organizations, and academics consider the Nation of Islam to be antisemitic. Specifically, they claim that the Nation of Islam has engaged in revisionist and antisemitic interpretations of the Holocaust and exaggerates the role of Jews in the African slave trade. The Anti-Defamation League (ADL) alleges that NOI Health Minister, Dr. Abdul Alim Muhammad, has accused Jewish doctors of injecting Blacks with the human immunodeficiency virus, an allegation that Muhammad has denied.

The Nation of Islam claimed that Jews were responsible for slavery, economic exploitation of black labor, selling alcohol and drugs in their communities, and unfair domination of the economy.

Some members of the Black Nationalist Nation of Islam claimed that Jews were responsible for the exploitation of black labor, bringing alcohol and drugs into their communities, and unfair domination of the economy.

The Nation of Islam has repeatedly denied charges of antisemitism, and NOI leader Minister Louis Farrakhan has stated, "The ADL ... uses the term 'anti-Semitism' to stifle all criticism of Zionism and the Zionist policies of the State of Israel and also to stifle all legitimate criticism of the errant behavior of some Jewish people toward the non-Jewish population of the earth."

American attitudes towards Jews

According to an Anti-Defamation League survey, 14 percent of U.S. residents had antisemitic views. The 2005 survey found "35 percent of foreign-born Hispanics" and "36 percent of African-Americans hold strong antisemitic beliefs, four times more than the 9 percent for whites". The 2005 Anti-Defamation League survey includes data on Hispanic attitudes, with 29% being most antisemitic (vs. 9% for whites and 36% for blacks); being born in the United States helped alleviate this attitude: 35% of foreign-born Hispanics, but only 19% of those born in the US.

Hate crimes

Escalating hate crimes which targeted Jews and members of other minority groups prompted the passage of the federal Hate Crimes Statistics Act in 1990. On April 1, 2014, Frazier Glenn Miller, a former member of the Ku Klux Klan arrived at the Jewish center of Kansas City and murdered 3 people.  After his capture, the suspect was heard saying "Heil Hitler".

In April 2014, the Anti-Defamation League published its 2013 audit of antisemitic incidents, the audit pointed out a decline of 19 percent in the number of reported antisemitic incidents. The total number of antisemitic attacks across the U.S. was 751, including 31 physical assaults, 315 incidents of vandalism and 405 cases of harassment.

The Vassar Students for Justice in Palestine published a Nazi World War II propaganda poster in May 2014. The poster displays Jews as part of a monster who tries to destroy the world. Vassar College president Catharine Hill denounced the poster. A few months later, a physical attack occurred in Philadelphia, when a Jewish student on the campus of Temple University was assaulted and punched in the face by a member of the organization Students for Justice in Palestine, who called him an antisemitic slur.

In May 2014, a Jewish mother from Chicago accused a group of students at her eighth-grade son's school of bullying and antisemitism. They used the multi-player video game Clash of Clans to create a group called "Jews Incinerator" and described themselves by stating: "we are a friendly group of racists with one goal- put all Jews into an army camp until they are disposed of. Sieg! Heil!" Two students wrote apology letters.

In June 2014 there were several antisemitic hate crimes. A swastika and other antisemitic graffiti were scrawled onto a streetside directional sign in San Francisco. Another graffiti found at the Sanctuary Lofts Apartments, where a graffiti artists drew antisemitic, satanic and racist symbols inside the apartment complex. Towards the end of the month a young Jewish boy was attacked while he was leaving his home in Brooklyn. The suspect, who was on a bike, opened his hand while passing and struck the victim in the face, then yelled antisemitic slurs.

In July 2014, during the 2014 Gaza War, there was an increase in the occurrence of antisemitic incidents. In the beginning of the month an antisemitic banner was flown above Brighton Beach and Coney Island. The banner contained symbols that meant "peace plus swastika equals love". The word "PROSWASTIKA" also appeared on the banner. Additionally, there were more than 5 incidents of antisemitic graffiti across the country. In Borough Park, Brooklyn, New York, three man were arrested for vandalizing a Yeshiva property and a nearby house in the Jewish neighborhood by spraying swastikas and inscriptions such as "you don't belong here". Later that month swastika drawings were found on mailboxes near a national Jewish fraternity house in Eugene, Oregon.

Swastika drawings and also the phrase 'kill Jews' were found on a playground floor in Riverdale, Bronx. There were also two incidents of graffiti in Clarksville, Tennessee and Lowell, Massachusetts.
Some vandalism incidents occurred on a cemetery in Massachusetts. and in country club in Frontenac, Missouri Toward the end of the month there were two places were the word 'Hamas' was scribbled on Jewish property and on a Synagogue
In addition, linked with the operation in Gaza Strip, anti-Jewish leaflets were found on cars in the Jewish neighborhood in Chicago. The leaflets threatened violence if Israel did not pull out of Gaza.

In August 2014 there were two incidents in Los Angeles and Chicago where leaflets from the Nazi era in Germany got resurrected. In Westwood, near the UCLA a Jewish store owner got swastika-marked leaflets contained threatens and warnings. A few days earlier, during a pro-Palestinian rally in Chicago, antisemitic leaflets were handed out to passersby. Those leaflets were exactly the same Nazi propaganda used in 1930's Germany.
Besides the above, there were more than six incidents of graffiti and vandalism aimed at the Jewish populations in various cities in the United States. Some of the graffiti compared Israel to Nazi Germany. There was also an antisemitic attack on four Orthodox Jewish teens in Borough Park, Brooklyn towards the mid-month. Another physical attack occurred in Philadelphia, when a Jewish student on the campus of Temple University was assaulted and punched in the face by a violent member of the anti-Israel organization SJP.

In the beginning of September 2014 there were more than 6 incidents of antisemitic graffiti across the country, three of them outside religious buildings such as a synagogue or Yeshiva. Most of the drawings included swastika inscriptions, and one of them had the words "Murder the Jew tenant". Later that month another antisemitic graffiti was found on the Jewish Community Center in Boulder, Colorado. Then, a few days later a violent attack occurred in Baltimore, Maryland, when during Rosh Hashanah a man who drove near the Jewish school shot three man after shouting "Jews, Jews, Jews".

Towards the end of the month a rabbi was thrown out of a Greek restaurant when the owner found out he was Jewish. Moreover, the owner suggested him a "full size salad" or "Jewish size salad" which according to him meant "cheap and small". Besides the above, Robert Ransdell, a write-in candidate for US Senate from Kentucky used the slogan "With Jews we lose" for his running. Another incident occurred in the University of North Carolina at Charlotte, when a Jewish student was told "to go burn in an oven." The student had also told the media she is "hunted" because of her support in Israel: "I have been called a terrorist, baby killer, woman killer, [told that] I use blood to make matzah and other foods, Christ killer, occupier, and much more."

October 2014 started with an antisemitic slur from a coffee shop owner in Bushwick who wrote on Facebook and Twitter that "greedy infiltrators" Jewish people came to buy a house near his business. Later that month, two synagogues were desecrated in Akron, Ohio, and in Spokane, Washington. One of them was sprayed with swastika graffiti and the other one was damaged by vandalism. During the month there was also a physical attack, when the head of a Hebrew association was beaten outside Barclays Center after a Nets-Maccabi Tel Aviv basketball game. The attacker was a participant in a pro-Palestinian demonstration outside the hall. During another incident in October, fliers were handed out in the University of California in Santa Barbara that claimed "9/11 Was an Outside Job" with a large blue Star of David. The fliers contained links to several websites that accusing Israel of the attack. A few days later an antisemitic graffiti was found on Jewish fraternity house in Emory University in Atlanta.

During December 2014 a Jewish Israeli young man was stabbed in his neck while standing outside of the Chabad-Lubavitch building in New York City. Another antisemitic incident in New York occurred when a threatening photo was sent to a Hasidic Jewish lawmaker. The photo showed his head pasted on the body of a person beheaded by the Islamic State jihadist group. Besides those incidents, several antisemitic graffiti found across the country, and a couple of synagogues were vandalized in Chicago and in Ocala, Florida.

January 2015 started with some antisemitic graffiti throughout the country, such as racist writing on a car and on an elevator's button. In February that year there were more incidents of antisemitic graffiti and harassment. In Sacramento, California, Israeli flags with a swastika instead of the Star of David were hung out of a house. An American flag with a swastika on it was also taped to the house's door. Earlier that month there were two incidents of antisemitic graffiti outside and inside the Jewish fraternity house at UC Davis. In Lakewood, NJ a Jewish-owned store was targeted with graffiti. That followed several other antisemitic messages found spray-painted and carved around town.

An incident at UCLA on February 10, 2015, where a Jewish student was questioned by a student council regarding whether being active in a Jewish organization constituted a "conflict of interest", illustrated the existing confusion among some students on this point.

In April 2015 the Anti Defamation League published its 2014 audit of antisemitic incidents. It counted 912 antisemitic incidents across the U.S. during 2014. This represents a 21 percent increase from the 751 incidents reported during the same period in 2013. Most of the incidents (513) belong to the category of "harassments, threats and events". The audit shows that most of the vandalism incidents occurred in public areas (35%). A review of the results shows that during Operation Protective Edge there was a significant increase in the number of antisemitic incidents, compares to the rest of the year. As usual, highest totals of antisemitic incidents have been found in states where there is a large Jewish population: New York State- 231 incidents, California- 184 incidents, New Jersey- 107 incidents, Florida- 70 incidents. In all of these states, more antisemitic incidents were counted in 2014 than in 2013.

On January 2, 2018, Blaze Bernstein was murdered by Samuel Woodward, who is a member of a neo-Nazi terrorist organization called Atomwaffen Division. It is being prosecuted as a hate crime on the basis of sexual orientation, but Woodward has made many antisemitic comments, and Bernstein was both gay and Jewish.

On October 27, 2018, 11 people were murdered in an attack on the Tree of Life – Or L'Simcha synagogue in Pittsburgh, Pennsylvania. The shooting was committed by Robert Bowers, a prolific user of the alt-tech social media service Gab where he promoted antisemitic tropes and conspiracy theories as well as the white nationalist doctrine of white genocide, which is claimed to be a Jewish conspiracy.

On April 27, 2019, the Chabad of Poway in California was attacked by a 19 year old gunman who killed 1 and injured 3. The shooter in question, John T. Earnest, had written an open letter which he posted on 8chan's /pol/ messageboard specifically blaming Jews for white genocide and other ills.

On December 10, 2019, a mass-shooting attack took place against a kosher grocery store in Jersey City, killing six (including both perpetrators). The attackers invoked tenets of an extremist version of Black Hebrew Israelite philosophy. In December 2019, the Jewish community of New York suffered a number of antisemitic attacks, including a mass stabbing in Monsey on the 28th.

In May 2021 there was an upsurge of antisemitic actions in the United States at the same time as the clashes between Israel and Hamas in Gaza.

On January 15, 2022, four people were taken hostage by a gunman at a synagogue in Colleyville, Texas. After a standoff with the police, the gunman, a British Pakistani, was killed and the hostages freed.

Later in 2022, right-wing political commentator Nick Fuentes blamed Jewish people themselves for antisemitic actions being carried out against the Jewish community. He further claimed that such actions would only get worse if "the Jews" did not support "people like us". Due to comments like these, Fuentes is regarded as an antisemite.

See also
 Jewish history
 Geography of antisemitism
 History of antisemitism
 History of the Jews in the United States
 Antisemitism in the United States in the 21st century
 List of antisemitic incidents in the United States
 List of attacks on Jewish institutions in the United States
 United States and the Holocaust
 Israel–United States relations
 Discrimination in the United States
 Racism in the United States
 Religious discrimination in the United States
 Timeline of Jewish history
 Timeline of antisemitism
 Timeline of the Holocaust

Notes

Further reading
 Dinnerstein, Leonard. Antisemitism in America (New York: Oxford University Press, 1994), a standard scholarly history
 Dinnerstein, Leonard. Uneasy at Home: Antisemitism and the American Jewish Experience New York: Columbia University Press, 1987.
 Dobkowski, Michael N. The Tarnished Dream: The Basis of American Anti-Semitism (Westport, Conn.: Greenwood Press, 1979, a major scholarly study online
 Gerber, David A., ed. Anti-Semitism in American History (Urbana: University of Illinois Press, 1986), scholarly essays.
 Gerteis, Joseph, and Nir Rotem. "Connecting the 'Others': White Anti-Semitic and Anti-Muslim Views in America." Sociological Quarterly (2022): 1-21.
 Goldstein, Judith S. The Politics of Ethnic Pressure: The American Jewish Committee Fight against Immigration Restriction, 1906–1917 (Routledge, 2020) online.
 Halperin, Edward C. "Why did the United States medical school admissions quota for Jews end?" American Journal of the Medical Sciences 358.5 (2019): 317-325.
 Handlin, Oscar, and Mary F. Handlin. "The Acquisition of Political and Social Rights by the Jews in the United States." The American Jewish Year Book (1955): 43-98. online
 Handlin, Oscar. “American Views of the Jew at the Opening of the Twentieth Century.” Publications of the American Jewish Historical Society 40#4, 1951, pp. 323–44. online
 Pollack, Norman. "Handlin on Anti-Semitism: A Critique of 'American Views of the Jew'." Journal of American History 51.3 (1964): 391-403. online
 Higham, John. Strangers in the land: Patterns of American nativism, 1860-1925 (1955) a famous classic. online
 Higham, John. Send these to me: immigrants in urban America (2nd ed. 1984) online, extensive coverage of anti-semitism
 Higham, John. "Social discrimination against Jews in America, 1830-1930." Publications of the American Jewish Historical Society 47.1 (1957): 1-33. online
 Jaher, Frederic Cople. A Scapegoat in the Wilderness: The Origins and Rise of Anti-Semitism in America (Cambridge: Harvard University Press, 1994), a standard scholarly history.
 Jacobs, Steven Leonard. "Antisemitism in the American Religious Landscape: The Present Twenty-First Century Moment." Socio-Historical Examination of Religion and Ministry 3.2 (2021) online.
 Levinger, Lee J. Anti-Semitism in the United States: Its History and Causes (1925). outdated
 Levy, Richard S., ed. Antisemitism: A historical encyclopedia of prejudice and persecution (2 vol, Abc-clio, 2005), worldwide coverage by experts. excerpt
 Marinari, Maddalena. Unwanted: Italian and Jewish mobilization against restrictive immigration laws, 1882–1965 (UNC Press Books, 2019).
 Martire, Gregory and Ruth Clark. Anti-Semitism in the United States: A Study of Prejudice in the 1980s (New York, N.Y.: Praeger, 1982).
 Rausch, David A. Fundamentalist-evangelicals and Anti-semitism (Philadelphia: Trinity Press International, 1993).
 Rosenfeld, Alvin H. "Antisemitism in Today’s America." in An End to Antisemitism! (2021): 367+ online.
 Scholnick, Myron I.  The New Deal and Anti-Semitism in America (New York: Garland Pub., 1990).
 Selzer, Michael, ed.  'Kike!:' A Documentary History of Anti-Semitism in America (New York, World Pub. 1972).
 Thernstrom, Stephan, Ann Orlov, and Oscar Handlin, eds. Harvard encyclopedia of American ethnic groups (Harvard UP) (1980); scholarly coverage of every major ethnic group
 Valbousquet, Nina. "'Un-American' Antisemitism?: The American Jewish Committee's Response to Global Antisemitism in the Interwar Period." American Jewish History 105.1 (2021): 77-102. excerpt
 Volkman, Ernest. A Legacy of Hate: Anti-Semitism in America (New York: F. Watts, 1982); popular history.

Historiography and memory
 Baigell, Matthew. The Implacable Urge to Defame: Cartoon Jews in the American Press, 1877-1935 (Syracuse University Press, 2017).
 Cohen, Naomi W. "Antisemitism in the gilded age: The Jewish view." Jewish Social Studies 41.3/4 (1979): 187-210. online
 Dobkowski, Michael N. “American Anti-Semitism: A Reinterpretation.” American Quarterly 29#2, (1977), pp. 166–81. ; emphasis on popular stereotypes
 Dobkowski, Michael N. "American antisemitism and American historians: A critique." Patterns of Prejudice 14.2 (1980): 33-43.  excerpt.
 Gordan, Rachel. "The 1940s as the Decade of the Anti-Antisemitism Novel." Religion and American Culture 31.1 (2021): 33-81. online
 Koffman, David S., et al. "Roundtable on Anti-Semitism in the Gilded Age and Progressive Era." Journal of the Gilded Age and Progressive Era 19.3 (2020): 473-505.
 Kranson, Rachel. "Rethinking the Historiography of American Antisemitism in the Wake of the Pittsburgh Shooting." American Jewish History 105.1 (2021): 247-253. excerpt
 MacDonald, Kevin. "Jewish involvement in shaping American immigration policy, 1881–1965: A historical review." Population and Environment 19.4 (1998): 295-356.
 Pollack, Norman. "The Myth of Populist Anti-Semitism." American Historical Review 68.1 (1962): 76-80. online
 Rockaway, Robert, and Arnon Gutfeld. "Demonic images of the Jew in the nineteenth century United States." American Jewish History 89.4 (2001): 355-381. 
 Rockaway, Robert. "Henry Ford and the Jews: The Mass Production of Hate." American Jewish History 89.4 (2001): 467-469. summary
 Stember, Charles, ed. Jews in the Mind of America (1966) online
 Tevis, Britt P. "Trends in the Study of Antisemitism in United States History." American Jewish History 105.1 (2021): 255-284. excerpt
 Varat, Deborah. " 'Their New Jerusalem': Representations of Jewish Immigrants in the American Popular Press, 1880–1903." Journal of the Gilded Age and Progressive Era 20.2 (2021): 277-300.
 Winston, Andrew S. "'Jews will not replace us!': Antisemitism, Interbreeding and Immigration in Historical Context." American Jewish History 105.1 (2021): 1-24. excerpt

 
Jewish-American history
History of the United States by topic